Tom Dobrzanski is a Canadian record producer, engineer, mixer and musician. He is based in Vancouver, BC. He is a former member of the rock band The Zolas, and is the owner of Monarch Studios. 
He began his recording career in 2001 with Vertical Studios, which he built in his parents' basement. He has recorded albums for local bands such as Said the Whale, Hey Ocean!, We Are the City and more. In October 2012 he officially opened Monarch Studios.

Dobrzanski has been nominated for multiple Western Canadian Music Awards including Producer of the Year and Engineer of the Year.

In 2013, Dobrzanski received a Juno Award nomination for Said the Whale's Little Mountain.

Selected discography

References

External links 
http://www.monarchstudios.com

Year of birth missing (living people)
Living people
Canadian record producers